Cinelatino is a Spanish-language movie channel based in Mexico and is owned by MVS Comunicaciones & Hemisphere Media Group (83.8% owned by InterMedia Partners).  The channel is available throughout Latin America as well as the United States and Canada, via cable, satellite and IPTV services.

Cinelatino airs Hispanic films, featuring blockbuster hits and critically acclaimed movies from Mexico, Latin America and Spain.  All movies are presented in their original format and without any commercial interruptions.  Cinelatino also features behind-the-scenes footage, interviews with film stars, exclusive coverage of Spanish film festivals and all the latest news from the Hispanic film industry.

Cinelatino has close working relations with the Los Angeles-based production company, Plus Entertainment, helmed by executive producer Pejman Partiyeli and producers Gonzalo Gonzalez and Rene Michelle Aranda. Plus Entertainment's annual slate of features is produced its entirety to suit Cinelatino's niche market and distributes titles to the likes of Redbox, Walmart and Netflix to promote the network's presence in the U.S., primarily Hollywood. Recent Plus Entertainment titles that have aired on Cinelatino include theatrically screened ,  starring Emmy-nominated actress Vannessa Vasquez of East Los High, 4-time film festival award winning   and more.

Plus Entertainment is currently developing Cinelatino's first ever TV series.

In Canada, Cinelatino is distributed by Telelatino Network and is currently available via Rogers Cable, Vidéotron, Cogeco and Bell Fibe TV.

See also
Cine Mexicano
Narco film

References

External links
 Cinelatino official website

Television networks in Mexico
MVS Comunicaciones